Mario Herrero O'Hara (April 20, 1946 – June 26, 2012) was a Filipino film director, film producer and screenwriter known for his sense of realism often with dark but realistic social messages.

Early life
He was born in Zamboanga City on April 20, 1946. His mother, Basilisa Herrero, was a native of Ozamiz in Misamis Occidental and had Spanish ancestry. His father, Jaime O'Hara was the son of Irish-American Thomasite, and a former member of the University of the Philippines Dramatic club. Mario had eight brothers and three sisters. Because Jaime was the son of an American citizen, Mario's family was eligible to apply for US citizenship; however, Mario rejected any such offers.

From Zamboanga City, the O'Haras moved to a middle-class suburb in Pasay; behind their house was a slum area, and Mario claimed that some of his works were inspired by real-life incidents that happened there. He took up Chemical Engineering at the Adamson University, simultaneously auditioning for a radio show sponsored by Procter and Gamble. At the age of 17, Mario stopped attending classes in 1963 to focus on his work in radio drama with the Manila Broadcasting Company (MBC) and DZRH.

Career

1960s-1970s
From 1963 to 1970, besides working at radio stations, he also worked for channels 2 and 11. He directed the drama series Lovingly Yours, Helen, Flordeluna (featuring Janice de Belen) and Alitaptap sa Gabing Madilim.

While at the MBC, he met Lino Brocka, who offered him a job as an announcer for his TV drama anthology Balintataw. Since then, O'Hara and Brocka frequently collaborated. Brocka offered O'Hara a role in his 1971 film Tubog sa Ginto ("Goldplated) and also cast him in dramatic productions at the Philippine Educational Theater Alliance (PETA). O'Hara, in turn, wrote the screenplay for Brocka's Weighed but Found Wanting (Tinimbang Ka Ngunit Kulang, 1974), about life in a small provincial town; in the movie, he also played the role of Bertong Ketongin (Berto the Leper) vis-a-vis Lolita Rodriguez, who played Berto's love interest Koala.

He wrote a teleplay which became the basis for Brocka's Insiang (1976), which is about a woman who was raped by her stepfather. O'Hara claimed that the script was inspired by a real story which happened in the slum behind their backyard. The film later went on to be screened at the Director's Fortnight, the first time that a Filipino film was accorded such honor at the Cannes Film Festival.

On the same year, he directed Tatlong Taong Walang Diyos (Three Godless Years), considered as O'Hara's masterpiece, which starred Nora Aunor; the movie was the first of many other collaborations O'Hara and Aunor had. The movie earned O'Hara his first nomination (for Best Director) at the FAMAS Awards.

From 1976 to 1980, he directed Alma Moreno's weekly TV drama anthology Alindog, and Rosa Rosal's Weekly TV drama anthology Ulila for BBC Channel 2.

In 1978, he wrote the screenplay for Lino Brocka's Rubia Servos. This led to the first award in his film career (Best Screenplay at the Metro Manila Film Festival).

1980s
During the 1980s, O'Hara collaborated anew with Nora Aunor: Kastilyong Buhangin ("Castle of Sand", 1981), featuring Lito Lapid; Bakit Bughaw ang Langit? ("Why is the sky blue?", 1981), which gave O'Hara a FAMAS nomination for Best Director; and Condemned (1984). For Bulaklak sa City Jail (Flowers of City Jail, 1984), both O'Hara and Aunor garnered wins at the Metro Manila Film Festival (for Best Director and Best Actress, respectively); nominations at the Gawad Urian; and a nomination for O'Hara and a win for Aunor at the FAMAS Awards.

In 1986, after the first EDSA Revolution, he filmed Bagong Hari ("New King") starring Dan Alvaro. The film was censored by the MTRCB and enjoyed a limited run in the theaters after an appeal with the MTRCB was overturned.

1990s
Under the auspices of Lily Monteverde and her pito-pito system (wherein a filmmaker is given a modest budget to shoot a film in 7 days and complete 7 days of post-production, hence the name), O'Hara created two films in just single span of the allowed time.

The first pito-pito was the drama Babae sa Bubungang Lata featuring veteran actress Anita Linda and set at the Manila North Cemetery.

The second one was the historical fantasy fiction Sisa. It is loosely based on the life of Philippine national hero Jose Rizal and the Sisa, a character in Rizal's novel Noli Me Tangere; in the movie, both Rizal and Sisa met and shared scenes.

2000s—2012
O'Hara's 2004 film Babae sa Breakwater addressed issues of poverty in Manila and was met with some considerable success.

In 2010, he filmed Ang Paglilitis ni Andres Bonifacio (The Trial of Andres Bonifacio), which entered the Director's Showcase category of the Cinemalaya film festival. It was his last movie.

In 2011, he worked with Nora Aunor on the miniseries Sa Ngalan ng Ina (In the Name of the Mother) for TV5.

When not doing films, he wrote, directed and acted in a number of plays. He has collaborated with the Tanghalang Pilipino and Philippine Educational Theater Alliance theater groups. He was supervising the production of his play "Stageshow", which is scheduled in October 2012, up until he was confined in the hospital until his death.

Death
He was admitted at the San Juan de Dios Hospital in Pasay, Philippines on June 15, 2012, to seek treatment for leukemia. Because he was a practicing Jehovah's Witness, he refused to have a blood transfusion, but relented on undergoing chemotherapy.

He succumbed to the disease eleven days later, on June 26, 2012, at age 66.

Filmography
NB: Official English titles (if available) are under "Title"; literal translations are under "Notes"

Awards and nominations

Cinemalaya Independent Film Festival
2010 - Ang Paglilitis ni Andres Bonifacio - Best Director (nominated)
Cinemanila International Film Festival
2004 - Netpac Award (awarded)- For a lifetime of achievement and dedication to the advancement of Philippine films, which are lauded and appreciated by film audiences around the world.
2004 - Babae sa Breakwater - Lino Brocka Award/Best Director (nominated)
2000 - Lifetime Achievement Award (awarded)
 Cinema One Digital Film Festival (Cinema One Originals)
 2011 - Honorary Awardees for Pioneering Efforts in Independent Cinema
FAMAS Awards
1985 - Bulaklak ng City Jail - Best Director (nominated)
1982 - Bakit bughaw ang langit? - Best Director (nominated)
1979 - Gumising Ka, Maruja - Best Supporting Actor (nominated)
1977 - Tatlong taong walang Diyos - Best Director (nominated)
1975 - Tinimbang Ka Ngunit Kulang - Best Supporting Actor (nominated)
1972 - Stardoom - Best Supporting Actor (nominated)
1971 - Tubog sa Ginto - Best Supporting Actor (nominated)
Gawad Urian Awards
 2011 - Babae sa Breakwater - Dekada Award: Best Film of the Decade (Natatanging Pelikula ng Dekada) (won)
 2004- Babae sa Breakwater - Best Direction (Pinakamahusay na Direksyon) (nominated)
 2004 - Babae sa Breakwater - Best Screenplay (Pinakamahusay na Dulang Pampelikula) (nominated)
1995 - Fatima Buen Story - Best Direction (Pinakamahusay na Direksyon) (won)
1987 - Bagong Hari - Best Direction (Pinakamahusay na Direksyon) (nominated)
1985 - Bulaklak ng City Jail - Best Direction (Pinakamahusay na Direksyon) (nominated)
1977 - Insiang - Best Screenplay (Pinakamahusay na Dulang Pampelikula) (nominated with Lamberto E. Antonio)
Golden Screen Awards, Philippines
2006 - Gawad Lino Brocka Award (won)
Metro Manila Film Festival
1986 - Halimaw sa Banga - Best Director (won)
1986 - Halimaw sa Banga - Best Actor (won)
1984 - Bulaklak ng City Jail - Best Director (won)
1978 - Rubia Servios - Best Screenplay (won)
Singapore International Film Festival
2001 - Pangarap ng Puso - Best Asian Feature Film (nominated)
Young Critics Circle, Philippines
2004 - Babae sa Breakwater - Best Film (won)
2004 - Babae sa Breakwater - Best Screenplay (won)
2000 - Sisa - Best Film (won)
2000 - Sisa - Best Screenplay (won)
1999 - Babae sa Bubungang Lata - Best Film (nominated
1999 - Babae sa Bubungang Lata - Best Screenplay (nominated)
National Artist of the Philippines
 year/s unknown - nominated but bypassed

References

External links

Senses of cinema
Mario O'Hara 1946 - 2012 Critic After Dark [Noel Vera]

1946 births
2012 deaths
Deaths from cancer in the Philippines
Deaths from leukemia
Filipino film directors
Filipino people of American descent
Filipino people of Irish descent
Filipino people of Spanish descent
Filipino screenwriters
Filipino television directors
People from Zamboanga City